Krisztián Hegyi (born 24 September 2002) is a Hungarian footballer who plays as a goalkeeper for West Ham United and the Hungary national team.

Career

In May 2019, Hegyi joined the youth academy of English Premier League side West Ham United despite receiving offers from a number of high profile clubs around Europe.

During the 2022-23 season, Hegyi was a regular first-choice goalkeeper and occasional captain for the club's U21 side, featuring in the Premier League 2 and EFL Trophy. He has also made several appearances on the bench for the first-team.

International career
In March 2023, after previously representing Hungary at youth level, Hegyi was called up for the senior team for the first time.

Style of play

West Ham United first-team goalkeeper coach Xavi Valero has praised Hegyi's mentality and maturity, whilst also stating he strongly believes he will go on to become the long-term No1 for his national team. Valero also added "he has all the tools needed to play at the highest level.”

References

External links

2002 births

Living people
Association football goalkeepers
Expatriate footballers in England
Hungarian expatriate footballers
Hungarian expatriate sportspeople in England
Hungarian footballers
Hungary youth international footballers
West Ham United F.C. players